Sport Chek is the largest Canadian retailer of sporting clothing and sports equipment, with 191 stores throughout Canada as of 2020. It is the only national big box sporting goods retailer in Canada, although it is absent in the Northwest Territories and Nunavut, while Quebec and Yukon are served by its sister brand Sports Experts instead. Its parent company, FGL Sports, also owns over a dozen sporting brands.

In 1999, a Sport Supercenter flagship store was opened on the top level of the Londonderry Mall, replacing an existing Walmart store. In 2014, the Londonderry Mall store relocated to Manning Town Centre, and was replaced by Simons in 2017. There was a second one in Place d'Orléans, but it was converted to Sport Chek/Nevada's Bob Golf in 2012. 

In 2011, Canadian Tire bought Sport Chek's parent company, FGL Sports (then known as Forzani), for $771 million, and has since embarked on a large scale brand restructuring.

New Sport Chek stores with Samsung OLED screens, tablets, and high tech were opened at West Edmonton Mall in 2014, Square One and Yorkdale in 2015, and a flagship SportChek/Atmosphere opened in Sherway Gardens in the GTA in July 2016.

Gallery

See also
 FGL Sports – Parent Company
 Canadian Tire – Parent Company
 Sports Experts – equivalent in Quebec
 Mark's (formerly Mark's Work Wearhouse) – another unit of Canadian Tire

References

External links

 Sport Chek website

Companies based in Calgary
Sporting goods retailers of Canada
Canadian brands
Canadian Tire
Retail companies established in 1999
1999 establishments in Alberta